Won Yoo-chul (born October 25, 1962) is a South Korean politician. He has a bachelor's degree in philosophy from Korea University. He is currently a member of the 19th National Assembly and the floor leader of Saenuri Party. On April 14, 2016, he was appointed interim leader of the party after its defeat in the 2016 general elections.

References

External links
Official website 

Members of the National Assembly (South Korea)
Korea University alumni
People from Gyeonggi Province
1962 births
Living people
Korean Roman Catholics
Wonju Won clan